Gustaf Johan Billberg (14 June 1772, Karlskrona – 26 November 1844, Stockholm) was a Swedish botanist, zoologist and anatomist, although professionally and by training he was a lawyer and used science and biology as an avocation. The plant genus Billbergia was named for him by Carl Peter Thunberg.

Biography
In 1790 he earned his legal degree at the University of Lund, later working as an auditor at the audit chamber in Stockholm from 1793. In 1798 he became a member of the county administrative board (landskamrerare) in Visby. In 1808 he returned to Stockholm, where from 1812 to 1837, he served as a member of the administrative court (kammarrättsråd). He was promoted in 1824 to head the ministry of the Board of Customs (generaltullstyrelsen).<ref>B. Boethius. [http://runeberg.org/sbh/billbegj.html Gustaf Johan Billberg] (Svenskt biografiskt handlexikon)</ref>

In 1812, he purchased the right of publishing to the precious work of Svensk Botanik from the estate of Johan Wilhelm Palmstruch. He subsequently prepared two parts for publication during 1812–1819. He was elected member of the Royal Swedish Academy of Sciences in 1817.
Selected works
Billberg was the author of the following works:
 Monographia mylabridum (1813)
 Ekonomisk botanik (1815)
 Enumeratio insectorum in museo (1820)
 Synopsis Faunae Scandinaviae (1827)

 References 

External links
 Kluge Untypified taxa in Billberg G. J., 1820.Enumeratio insectorum in museo Gust. Joh. Billberg. Typus Gadelianus''
 IPNI Plants described or co-described by Billberg

1772 births
1844 deaths
People from Karlskrona
Lund University alumni
Swedish botanists
Swedish entomologists
19th-century Swedish zoologists
Swedish civil servants
Members of the Royal Swedish Academy of Sciences